USS Charles Ausburn may refer to:

She was transferred to the German Navy in 1960, as Z-6 until scrapped in 1968.

Sources

United States Navy ship names